Joseph Allen (September 2, 1749 – September 2, 1827) was a member of the eleventh United States Congress from  (1810–1811).

He was born in Boston in the Province of Massachusetts Bay, and graduated from Harvard University in 1774.  He worked in a business in Leicester, in 1774, moving to Worcester in 1776.  He was elected to the United States House of Representatives in 1810, serving in that capacity through 1811.  He died in Worcester in 1827.

References
Who Was Who in America: Historical Volume 1607-1896. Chicago: Marquis Who's Who, 1967.

1749 births
1827 deaths
Politicians from Boston
Harvard University alumni
People of colonial Massachusetts
Federalist Party members of the United States House of Representatives from Massachusetts
People from colonial Boston